Zumba Fitness: World Party (a.k.a. Zumba Fitness 4) is the fourth video game in the installment of the Fitness series, with this game being the sequel to Zumba Fitness Core (2012). This game is based on the Zumba program as it was then later followed by Zumba Kids (2013). The game was developed by Zoë Mode and published by Majesco Entertainment. It was released for Xbox 360, Wii U, Wii, and Xbox One consoles in November 2013.

Gameplay
There are 45 pre-set classes as well as customizable workouts. Players can learn different dance styles, including salsa, hip-hop, Tahitian, calypso, Bollywood, cumbia, reggaeton and Irish step. The world tour mode allows players to unlock songs from seven global destinations.

The "Progress Tracker Plus" tallies all of a player's statistics, including technique score, calories burned and goals met. Players can set personal fitness goals or work towards pre-set goals to unlock bonus rewards. Motivational rewards include behind-the-scenes videos, passport stamps, postcards, souvenirs, fitness tips and achievements. Low-, medium- and high-intensity routines are available, along with expanded tutorials.

Two-player support is available on Xbox One and Kinect for Xbox 360. Four-player support is available on Wii U and Wii.

Soundtrack
Over 40 songs, both Zumba originals and licensed tracks, will be featured in the soundtrack.

A "(XO)" indicates that the song is an Xbox One exclusive.

Reception 

 Steve Hannley of Hardcore Gamer gave the game a 4/5, calling it "the most polished iteration yet."
 Brian Albert of IGN gave the game a 7.2/10, saying "Zumba Fitness: World Party: isn't great at bringing in new people, but the dance workouts are fun regardless of skill.

References

2013 video games
Dance video games
Fitness games
Kinect games
Majesco Entertainment games
Music video games
Unreal Engine games
Wii games
Wii U games
Wii U eShop games
Xbox 360 games
Xbox One games
Video games developed in the United Kingdom
Video game sequels
Multiplayer and single-player video games
Hamster Corporation games
Zoë Mode games